Loch Insh is a loch in Highlands region, Scotland.

It is situated in the heart of Badenoch and Strathspey, seven miles south of Aviemore and seven miles north of Kingussie. The nearest village to the loch  is Kincraig. The loch is a location for sailing, windsurfing and kayaking/canoeing. There is a well stocked watersports centre on the southeast side of the loch and good fishing also. The watersports centre is complemented by several Chalets and a small hotel by the name of Insh Hall.

Gallery

See also
 List of freshwater islands in Scotland

External links
Loch Insh Watersports

Lochs of Highland (council area)
Badenoch and Strathspey
Freshwater lochs of Scotland
LInch